Lalmatiya is a town and Village Development Committee  in Dang District in Lumbini Province of south-western Nepal. At the time of the 1991 Nepal census it had a population of 12,048 persons living in 1900 individual households.

It includes Bhalubang, a bazaar situated at the Terai/Hill interface and now a junction on the east-west Mahendra Highway where branch roads served by scheduled buses go to Pyuthan and Rolpa districts.

References

External links
UN map of the municipalities of Dang Deokhuri District

Populated places in Dang District, Nepal